Club de Fútbol Pozuelo de Alarcón is a football team based in Pozuelo de Alarcón in the autonomous Community of Madrid. Founded in 1995, the team plays in Tercera División RFEF – Group 7. The club's home ground is Estadio Valle de las Cañas, which has a capacity of 2,000 spectators.

History  
The CF Pozuelo de Alarcón was founded in 1995 through the merger of the two clubs more representative of the city of Pozuelo de Alarcón, the UD Pozuelo and  Parque Atlético Pozuelo, though its foundation was in 1995, its origins date back to August 28, 1943.

Season to season

CD Pozuelo / UD Pozuelo

2 seasons in Tercera División

CF Parque At. Pozuelo

CF Pozuelo de Alarcón

13 seasons in Tercera División
1 season in Tercera División RFEF

Uniform 

Uniform holder: green shirt, green trousers and half white.
Uniform alternative: red T-shirt, white trousers and half red.

Stadium 
The CF Pozuelo de Alarcón plays its matches in the local as Ciudad Deportiva Valle de Las Cañas, with capacity for 2,000 spectators.

Women's department

References

External links
Official website 
Futbolme team profile 

Football clubs in the Community of Madrid
Association football clubs established in 1995
1995 establishments in Spain
Sport in Pozuelo de Alarcón